Dallas Blocker (born Nathan Blocker a.k.a. Dallas) is an American singer, producer and songwriter. After signing with Latium Records in 2004, Blocker later formed independent label Blockerboy Music LLC on which he released the EP Alone, the album Love and Lust (in Japan) and the Billboard chart hit "Rock Ya Body".

Early life

Blocker was born and reared for a short time in Dallas, Texas by his mother, but later joined his father at age seven in Trinity Gardens – a Northeast Houston, Texas neighborhood.  He began singing and performing in church at a young age, and eventually chose the stage name “Dallas” to acknowledge both the city in which he was born and his mother, a long-time Dallas, Texas resident.

Musical Beginnings

While acclimating to life in Houston, Blocker busied himself singing, learning to produce music and penning his own lyrics.  While attending Kashmere High School and during college, Blocker was a member of a male R&B group, which included Brian Angel of Day26. The group environment allowed Blocker to use his skills as a songwriter, producer and lead vocalist to amass the interest of new fans and local music industry executives. He also was the choir director at Fallbrook Church

Career: Collaborations

Blocker has collaborated with many noted musical artists throughout his career, including producer Bryan Michael Cox; lead vocalist of R&B group H-Town the late Kevin “Dino” Conner; rappers Bun B, Rick Ross, J-Dawg, Z-Ro, Slim Thug, Tum Tum, Lil Flip, Mike Jones, Paul Wall, and Trae; and several KBXX DJs.  His work includes lead vocals, production and writing on "Get It Girl", which is featured on the Bring It On: All or Nothing music soundtrack, and "After Da Club" with the late rapper Hawk.  It was this smash hit that allowed Blocker to forge a relationship with Latium Records, which hosts artist Pitbull and formerly hosted artists Chamillionaire, Slim Thug, Frankie J, Natalie and Baby Bash.

Career: Solo Efforts

In 2008, Blocker took control of his music career by establishing his independent label Blockerboy Music LLC following a year under contract, and later, a voluntary release from Latium Records.  With the release of Alone (EP) and the subsequent release of the Love & Lust album in Japan, Blocker soon headlined Japan's Save R&B tour in September 2009 and opened for R&B star Babyface at Houston's Arena Theater in August 2010.  In 2010, Blocker's smash hit “Rock Ya Body,” produced by Texas hit-making duo Beanz N Kornbread, debuted on Billboard’s Top 100 chart at #75 and was heard by more than two million listeners weekly with heavy radio play in Florida, Georgia, Louisiana, Oklahoma and Texas.  The single spent 20 weeks on the Billboard charts.  To accompany the single's wave of success, the “Rock Ya Body” video, which was directed by Michael Kimbrew in association with TF Records, was also released in 2010, and featured Farrah Franklin (formerly of Destiny's Child), Montana Fishburne and Orlando Brown.  In 2011, Blocker released the single “Out Da Club” featuring Diamond; soon after, the single's video—featuring Z-Ro and directed by JC Visuals in association with Blockerboy Music LLC—followed.

Discography

Albums

2008: Alone (EP)
2009: Love and Lust

Singles

2010: “Rock Ya Body”
2013: “Elevator”
2013: “Heels Up”

Singles (Featured Artist)

2004: "I've Been Hustlin" by Trae (featuring Dallas Blocker) – Same Thing Different Day
2004: "Time After Time" by Trae (featuring Dallas Blocker) – Same Thing Different Day
2006: "The Rain" by Trae (featuring Dallas Blocker & Shyna) – Restless
2007: “After the Club” by Mista Madd (featuring Hawk & Dallas Blocker) 
2010: "My City" by Paul Wall (featuring Dallas Blocker & Yo Gotti) – Heart of a Champion
2010: "Beat It Up" by Slim Thug (featuring Dallas Blocker) – Tha Thug Show
2011: "Pig Feet" by Z-Ro (featuring Dallas Blocker) – Meth
2011: “Hold of Me” by GT Mayne (featuring Dallas Blocker and Z-Ro)

Production

2004: "Oh No Reloaded" by Trae (featuring Paul Wall) – Same Thing Different Day

References

External links
 

21st-century African-American male singers
African-American songwriters
American contemporary R&B singers
American hip hop singers
Living people
Musicians from Houston
American male pop singers
Songwriters from Texas
Year of birth missing (living people)
American male songwriters